Robert de Flixthorpe (fl. 1295–1302) was an English politician.

He was a Member (MP) of the Parliament of England for Rutland in 1295 and 1302.

References

13th-century births
Year of death missing
English MPs 1295
English MPs 1302